The following elections occurred in the year 1849.

 1849 French legislative election
 1849 Liberian general election

North America

United States
 1849 New York state election
 1849 Texas gubernatorial election
 United States Senate election in New York, 1849

See also
 :Category:1849 elections

1849
Elections